The James Beard Foundation Awards are annual awards presented by the James Beard Foundation to recognize culinary professionals in the United States. The awards recognize chefs, restaurateurs, authors and journalists each year, and are generally scheduled around James Beard's May birthday.  

The foundation also awards annually since 1998 the designation of America's Classic for local independently-owned restaurants that reflect the charcter of the community.

2020 awards
The 2020 chef and restaurant awards were canceled, due to the COVID-19 pandemic. The book and media awards were announced online on May 27, 2020. A virtual event was broadcast from Chicago on September 25, 2020.

Lifetime Achievement and Humanitarian Award
 Lifetime Achievement Award: Jessica B. Harris
 Humanitarian of the Year: Zero Foodprint

Restaurant Design Awards
75 Seats and Under: Heliotrope Architects, Rupee Bar, Seattle, Washington
76 Seats and Over: ORA and Klein Agency, Auburn, Los Angeles, California
Design Icon: Chez Panisse, Berkeley, California

Book Awards
The 2020 James Beard Foundation Book Awards were as follows:

 American Cooking: Jubilee: Recipes from Two Centuries of African American Cooking by Toni Tipton-Martin (Clarkson Potter)
 Baking and Dessert: Living Bread: Tradition and Innovation in Artisan Bread Making by Daniel Leader and Lauren Chattman (Avery)
 Beverage with Recipes: The NoMad Cocktail Book by Leo Robitschek (Ten Speed Press)
 Beverage without Recipes: World Atlas of Wine 8th Edition by Hugh Johnson and Jancis Robinson (Mitchell Beazley)
 General Cooking: Where Cooking Begins: Uncomplicated Recipes to Make You a Great Cook by Carla Lalli Music (Clarkson Potter)
 Health and Special Diets: Gluten-Free Baking at Home: 102 Foolproof Recipes for Delicious Breads, Cakes, Cookies, and More by Jeffrey Larsen (Ten Speed Press)
 International: Ethiopia: Recipes and Traditions from the Horn of Africa by Yohanis Gebreyesus with Jeff Koehler (Interlink Publishing)
 Photography: American Sfoglino: A Master Class in Handmade Pasta by Eric Wolfinger (Chronicle Books)
 Reference, History, and Scholarship: The Whole Okra: A Seed to Stem Celebration by Chris Smith (Chelsea Green Publishing)
 Restaurant and Professional: The Whole Fish Cookbook: New Ways to Cook, Eat and Think by Josh Niland (Hardie Grant Books)
 Single Subject: Pasta Grannies: The Official Cookbook: The Secrets of Italy's Best Home Cooks by Vicky Bennison (Hardie Grant Books)
 Vegetable-Focused Cooking: Whole Food Cooking Every Day: Transform the Way You Eat with 250 Vegetarian Recipes Free of Gluten, Dairy, and Refined Sugar by Amy Chaplin (Artisan Books)
 Writing: Eat Like a Fish: My Adventures as a Fisherman Turned Restorative Ocean Farmer by Bren Smith (Knopf)
 Book of the Year: The Whole Fish Cookbook: New Ways to Cook, Eat and Think by Josh Niland (Hardie Grant Books)
 Cookbook Hall of Fame: Jancis Robinson

Broadcast Media Awards
The 2020 James Beard Foundation Broadcast Media Awards were as follows:

 Audio Program: It Burns: The Scandal-Plagued Race to Breed the World’s Hottest Chili, Audible
 Audio Reporting: Gravy – Mahalia Jackson’s Glori-Fried Chicken, Betsy Sheperd, southernfoodways.org
 Documentary: That's My Jazz, Vimeo
 Online Video, Fixed Location and/or Instructional: Grace Young – Wok Therapist, YouTube
 Online Video, on Location: Handmade – How Knives Are Made for New York's Best Restaurants; How a Ceramics Master Makes Plates for Michelin-Starred Restaurants, Eater
 Outstanding Personality: Roy Choi, Broken Bread with Roy Choi, KCET
 Television Program, in Studio or Fixed Location: Pati's Mexican Table – Tijuana: Stories from the Border, WETA
 Television Program, on Location: Las Crónicas del Taco (Taco Chronicles) – Canasta, Netflix
 Visual and Technical Excellence: Chef's Table, Netflix, Adam Bricker, Chloe Weaver, and Will Basanta
 Visual Reporting (on TV or Online): Rotten – The Avocado War, Netflix, Christine Haughney, Erin Cauchi, and Gretchen Goetz

Journalism Awards
The 2020 James Beard Foundation Journalism Awards were as follows:

 Columns: Power Rankings: “The Official Fast Food French Fry Power Rankings”; “The Official Spicy Snack Power Rankings”; “The Official Domestic Beer Power Rankings” by Lucas Kwan Peterson, Los Angeles Times
 Craig Claiborne Distinguished Restaurant Review Award: “Peter Luger Used to Sizzle. Now It Sputters.”; “The 20 Most Delicious Things at Mercado Little Spain”; “Benno, Proudly Out of Step With the Age” by Pete Wells, The New York Times
 Dining and Travel: “In Pursuit of the Perfect Pizza” by Matt Goulding, Airbnb Magazine
 Feature Reporting : “Value Meal” by Tad Friend, The New Yorker
 Food Coverage in a General Interest Publication: The New Yorker
 Foodways: “A Real Hot Mess: How Grits Got Weaponized Against Cheating Men” by Cynthia R. Greenlee, MUNCHIES / Food by VICE
 Health and Wellness: “How Washington Keeps America Sick and Fat”; “Meet the Silicon Valley Investor Who Wants Washington to Figure Out What You Should Eat” by Catherine Boudreau and Helena Bottemiller Evich, Politico
 Home Cooking: "Fry Time" by Nancy Singleton Hachisu, Saveur
 Innovative Storytelling: “Food and Loathing on the Campaign Trail” by Gary He, Matt Buchanan, and Meghan McCarron, Eater
 Investigative Reporting: “The Man Who Attacked Me Works in Your Kitchen’: Victim of Serial Groper Took Justice into Her Own Hands” by Amy Brittain and Maura Judkis, The Washington Post
 Jonathan Gold Local Voice Award: “In Search of Hot Beef”; “Chef Jack Riebel Is in the Fight of His Life”; “Harry Singh on the Perfect Roti, Trinidad, and Life in the Kitchen” by Dara Moskowitz Grumdahl, Mpls.St.Paul Magazine
 M.F.K. Fisher Distinguished Writing Award: “My Mother's Catfish Stew” by John T. Edge, Oxford American
 Personal Essay, Long Form: “The Dysfunction of Food” by Kim Foster
 Personal Essay, Short Form: “For 20 Years, happy hour has seen us through work — and life” by M. Carrie Allan, The Washington Post
 Profile: “The Provocations of Chef Tunde Wey” by Brett Martin, GQ Magazine
 Wine, Spirits, and Other Beverages: “Seltzer Is Over. Mineral Water Is Forever.” by Jordan Michelman, PUNCH
 Emerging Voice Award: L.A. Taco

2021 awards
In August 2020, the James Beard Foundation announced that the 2020 awards presentation would be cancelled because of COVID and they will “forgo its traditional Awards presentation in 2021, including the Restaurant and Chef Awards, Media Awards, and Restaurant Design Awards. We will not be accepting recommendations or submissions. We will be working with the Awards Committee and Subcommittees to overhaul the policies and procedures for the Awards.”

2022 awards

Lifetime Achievement and Humanitarian Award 

 Lifetime Achievement Award: Martin Yan
 Humanitarian of the Year: Grace Young

Leadership Award 
 Leadership Award: Mónica Ramírez The other winners include Irene Li, Erika Allen, Mavis-Jay Sanders

Restaurant and Chef Awards 
The James Beard Foundation Restaurant and Chef Awards in 2022 were as follows: 
 Outstanding Restaurateur: Chris Bianco, Tratto, Pane Bianco, and Pizzeria Bianco, Phoenix, AZ
 Outstanding Chef: Mashama Bailey, The Grey, Savannah, GA
 Outstanding Restaurant : Chai Pani, Asheville, NC
 Emerging Chef: Edgar Rico, Nixta Taqueria, Austin, TX
 Best New Restaurant: Owamni, Minneapolis, MN
 Outstanding Pastry Chef: Warda Bouguettaya, Warda Pâtisserie, Detroit, MI
 Outstanding Baker: Don Guerra, Barrio Bread, Tucson, AZ
 Outstanding Hospitality: Cúrate, Asheville, NC
 Outstanding Wine Program: The Four Horsemen, New York, NY
 Outstanding Bar Program: Julep, Houston, TX
 Best Chefs
 Best Chef: California - Brandon Jew, Mister Jiu's, San Francisco, CA
 Best Chef: Great Lakes (IL, IN, MI, OH) - Erick Williams, Virtue Restaurant & Bar, Chicago, IL
 Best Chef: Mid-Atlantic (DC, DE, MD, NJ, PA, VA) - Cristina Martinez, South Philly Barbacoa, Philadelphia, PA
 Best Chef: Midwest (IA, KS, MN, MO, NE, ND, SD, WI) - Dane Baldwin, The Diplomat, Milwaukee, WI
 Best Chef: Mountain (CO, ID, MT, UT, WY) - Caroline Glover, Annette, Aurora, CO
 Best Chef: New York State - Chintan Pandya, Dhamaka, New York, NY
 Best Chef: Northeast (CT, MA, ME, NH, RI, VT) - Nisachon Morgan, Saap, Randolph, VT
 Best Chef: Northwest and Pacific (AK, HI, OR, WA) - Robynne Maii, Fête, Honolulu, HI
 Best Chef: Southeast (GA, KY, NC, SC, TN, WV) - Ricky Moore, SALTBOX Seafood Joint, Durham, NC
 Best Chef: South (AL, AR, FL, LA, MS, PR) - Adam Evans, Automatic Seafood and Oysters, Birmingham, AL
 Best Chef: Southwest (AZ, NM, NV, OK) - Fernando Olea, Sazón, Santa Fe, NM
 Best Chef: Texas - Iliana de la Vega, El Naranjo, Austin, TX

References

James Beard Foundation Award winners